Die Trying may refer to:

 Die Trying (band), an American rock band
 Die Trying (album), a 2003 album by the band
 Die Trying (novel), a 1998 Jack Reacher novel by Lee Child

See also